Barichara is a town and municipality in the Santander Department in northeastern Colombia.

In 2010, in recognition of its history, architecture, and touristic potential, Barichara was declared a Colombian Pueblo Patrimonio (heritage town). It is amongst only 11 municipalities nationwide that were selected to be part of the Red Turística de Pueblos Patrimonio original cohort.

The town's unique, colorful architecture was an inspiration for the settings in the hit 2021 Disney animated feature Encanto.

References

External links 

 Tourism information Barichara

Municipalities of Santander Department
Populated places established in 1705